Aspidifrontia is a genus of moths of the family Noctuidae.

References
De Prins, J. & De Prins, W. 2014. Afromoths, online database of Afrotropical moth species (Lepidoptera). World Wide Web electronic publication (www.afromoths.net) (13.Sep.2014)
Natural History Museum Lepidoptera genus database

External links
 images at boldsystems.org

Hadeninae
Noctuoidea genera